Hajji Fath Ali (also Romanized as Ḩājjī Fatḩ ‘Alī and Ḩājī Fatḩ ‘Alī; also known as Haj Fat-hali and Ḩājj Fatḩ ‘Alī) is a village in Yeylaq Rural District, in the Central District of Buin va Miandasht County, Isfahan Province, Iran. At the 2006 census, its population was 167, in 23 families.

References 

Populated places in Buin va Miandasht County